The 2018 Shreveport mayoral election resulted in the election of Democrat Adrian Perkins who defeated incumbent mayor of Shreveport Ollie Tyler in the runoff. The nonpartisan blanket primary was held on November 6, 2018, and as no candidate obtained the required majority, the general election followed on December 8, 2018.

Results

|}

|}

References

Shreveport
Government of Shreveport, Louisiana
2018 Louisiana elections
December 2018 events in the United States